Ekaterina Karavelova, (21 October 1860 in Rouschuk – 1 April 1947 in Sofia), was a Bulgarian educator, translator, publicist, suffragist and women's rights activist. She was the founder of the cultural women's organization Maika and its chairperson in 1899-1929, Vice chairperson of the Bulgarian Women's Union in 1915-1925, president of the Bulgarian branch of the Women's International League for Peace and Freedom in 1925, co-founder of the Bulgarian-Romanian Association in 1932, co-founder of the Bulgarian Writers Association and its president in 1935.

Active as a teacher, she was early on active in the debate of women's education and status of female teachers. In 1901, she was a co-founder of the Bulgarian Women's Union alongside Vela Blagoeva, Kina Konova, Anna Karima and Julia Malinova. The organization was an umbrella organization of the 27 local women's organisations that had been established in Bulgaria since 1878. It was founded as a reply to the limitations of women's education and access to university studies in the 1890s, with the goal to further women's intellectual development and participation, arranged national congresses and used Zhenski glas as its organ. Ekaterina Karavelova served as a Bulgarian delegate of several international conferences. In 1935 she opposed the capital punishment of political prisoners in Bulgaria, and in 1938 served in a commission that opposed the closure of Bulgarian schools in Romania.

Karavelova Point in Antarctica “is named after Ekaterina Karavelova (1860–1947), translator, author and woman activist.”

See also
 List of peace activists

Notes

References
 Francisca de Haan, Krasimira Daskalova & Anna Loutfi: Biographical Dictionary of Women's Movements and Feminisms in Central, Easterna and South Eastern Europe, 19th and 20th centuries Central European University Press, 2006

1860 births
1947 deaths
Bulgarian women's rights activists
Bulgarian feminists
Pacifist feminists
19th-century Bulgarian people
Bulgarian suffragists
Women's International League for Peace and Freedom people
19th-century Bulgarian women
19th-century Bulgarian educators